Beverly Hills Ninja is a 1997 American martial arts comedy film directed by Dennis Dugan, written by Mark Feldberg and Mitch Klebanoff. The film stars Chris Farley, Nicollette Sheridan, Nathaniel Parker, with Chris Rock, and Robin Shou. The main plot revolves around Haru (portrayed by Farley), a white orphan boy who is found by a clan of ninjas as an infant in an abandoned treasure chest and is raised by them.

Haru never quite conforms to their culture and never acquires the skills of a ninja, but is nonetheless good natured, and persevering in his personal ambitions. His first mission brings him to Beverly Hills to investigate a murder mystery. It was the last film starring Farley to be released in his lifetime, as he died eleven months after its release.

Plot
A clan of ninja in Japan finds an abandoned chest that has been washed onto shore with a white baby boy inside. One of their ancient legends spoke of a foreign white male who would come among them and become a master like no other would. Haru is raised amongst the ninja, with the expectation that he may become the legendary master. As Haru grows into adulthood, doubts are quickly cast over this, as he is clumsy and lacking his ninja skills, and so he fails to graduate as a ninja with the rest of his class. Left alone to protect the temple while the clan are on a mission, Haru disguises himself as a ninja when an American woman, Sally Jones, comes to the temple seeking assistance. She tells Haru that she is suspicious of her boyfriend, Martin Tanley, and asks him to investigate. Haru discovers that Tanley and his bodyguard, Nobu, are involved in a money counterfeiting business, but is unable to inform Sally before she leaves. Haru leaves Japan and later flies to Beverly Hills in search of Sally. Haru's adoptive brother, Gobei, is sent by the clan's sensei to secretly watch over and protect him during his mission.

Haru checks in at a Beverly Hills hotel, where he befriends its bellboy, Joey Washington, and teaches him some ninja lessons. Unaware that Gobei is helping him, Haru manages to find Sally. Haru tracks Tanley and Nobu to a night club in Little Tokyo, where they are attempting to retrieve a set of counterfeiting plates from their rival gang. The gangs fight, resulting in the deaths of two of the rival gang members, for which Haru finds himself as being the prime suspect. Haru returns to the hotel room the next day, where he receives his guidance from his sensei. Haru resumes his search for Sally, and locates Tanley's mansion. Haru finds Sally and discovers that her real name is actually Alison Page. Alison informs him that Tanley murdered her sister, and that she is dating Tanley while using a fake name in order to get evidence. Haru discovers that Tanley will be hiring an ink specialist, Chet Walters, to help counterfeit money. Haru disguises himself as Walters and later infiltrates Tanley's warehouse. Haru's identity is exposed after failing to properly counterfeit the money and Tanley captures him. While Tanley succeeds in obtaining the other half of the plates from the rival gang, Alison rescues Haru, only to be kidnapped by Tanley herself. Haru enlists Joey's help in finding Tanley's warehouse to rescue Alison. Gobei intervenes without Haru's knowledge and leads them back to the warehouse.

Haru tries to intervene, but is overwhelmed by guards. Gobei reveals himself to Haru, and manages to distract the guards, allowing Haru to rescue Alison. Haru uses a forklift to smash two holes of the room where Tanley locked up Alison with a bomb. Haru tries to defuse the bomb, but he accidentally resets it for five minutes. On hearing Gobei become overwhelmed by the guards, Haru goes to help him. Haru snaps and suddenly demonstrates amazing martial arts moves, stunning Gobei. Haru saves Gobei's life and successfully defeats several guards himself. Haru and Gobei are left facing off Nobu and two guards. Trying to enter the building, Joey crashes through a window and knocks himself and one of the guards unconscious. Haru and Gobei defeat Nobu and the remaining guard and later fights Tanley. In the fight that follows, Haru accidentally knocks Gobei unconscious by hitting him in the head with a sheave, but he manages to force Tanley to flee afterwards. Haru continues to rescue Alison, where he uses a large harpoon gun mounted on a cart and shoots it through the room and inadvertently lands in the back of a truck in which Tanley is trying to escape. The harpoon drags the bomb into Tanley's truck and explodes into flames. Haru successfully rescues Alison, while Tanley and his surviving hitmen are arrested by Los Angeles police.

Haru tells his sensei that he will be living in Beverly Hills with Alison. As Haru and Alison leave together for Beverly Hills, a grappling hook tied to a rope has fallen from the bus and accidentally hooks into Gobei's wheelchair, causing him to be thrown into the Pacific Ocean. Haru shouts an apology to Gobei at the end of the film.

Cast
 Chris Farley as Haru
 Jason Davis as Young Haru
 Nicollette Sheridan as Sally Jones / Alison Page 
 Nathaniel Parker as Martin Tanley
 Soon-Tek Oh as Sensei
 Chris Rock as Joey Washington
 Robin Shou as Gobei
 Keith Cooke Hirabayashi as Nobu
 William Sasso as Chet Walters (uncredited)
 François Chau as Izumo
 Jason Tobin as Busboy
 John P. Farley as Policeman
 Kevin Farley as Policeman
 Billy Connolly as Japanese Antique Shop Proprietor (uncredited)
 Patrick Breen as Desk Manager (uncredited)
 Steve Terada as Martial Artist (uncredited)

Dana Carvey was originally attached to play Haru back in 1990.

Box office
In its opening weekend, the film topped the North American box office with $12,220,920. It went on to gross $31,480,418 in North America and $6,393,685 in other territories, for a total of  grossed worldwide.

Reception
Beverly Hills Ninja received generally negative reviews. On Rotten Tomatoes the film has an approval rating of 14% based on reviews from 29 critics. The site's consensus states: "Far from silent, but comedically deadly, Beverly Hills Ninja proves painfully unfunny." On Metacritic it has a score of 27 out of 100 based on reviews from 11 critics. Audiences surveyed by CinemaScore gave the film a grade B+ on scale of A to F.

James Berardinelli panned the film, stating that "Beverly Hills Ninja is essentially a one-joke film. That joke has to do with Chris Farley [...], who plays one of the clumsiest men on Earth, crashing into objects or having things fall on his head" and concluded that it "isn't just juvenile, it's lackluster and unfunny."

Bruce Fretts of Entertainment Weekly also criticized the film, complaining it had "...a yawner plot about Farley busting up a yen counterfeiting ring" and that"...when the writers run out of ideas, they simply have Farley walk into a lamppost, or cop from old SNL skits."

A favorable review came from Mick LaSalle of the San Francisco Chronicle who wrote that it is "not the kind of picture that gets respect from New York critics, but it's funny. [...] This is a movie in which the audience knows half the gags in advance, but thanks to director Dennis Dugan's timing and Farley's execution, the audience doesn't just laugh anyway, but laughs harder... he's too good, too funny and too in control of his out-of-controlness to be a mere buffoon." Leonard Klady of Variety magazine wrote: "This sweet saga of an underachiever who makes good is surprisingly appealing and sure to broaden the portly comic's fan base."

Soundtrack

Track listing
 "You're a Ninja?..." – Chris Farley, Chris Rock
 "Kung Fu Fighting" – Patti Rothberg
 "One Way or Another" – Blondie
 "...We Are in Danger..." – Chris Farley, Nathaniel Parker
 "Tsugihagi Boogie Woogie" – Ulfuls
 "Low Rider" – War
 "The blackness of my belt..." – Chris Farley, Chris Rock
 "Tarzan Boy" – Baltimora
 "...my identity must remain mysterious..." – Chris Farley, Curtis Blanck
 "Turning Japanese" – The Hazies
 "You're the big, fat Ninja, aren't you?" – Chris Farley, Nathaniel Parker
 "Kung Fu Fighting" – Carl Douglas
 "I'm Too Sexy" – Right Said Fred
 "...close to the temple, not inside" – Chris Farley, Nicollette Sheridan
 "I Think We're Alone Now" (Japanese version) – Lene Lovich
 "Finally Got It" – Little John
 "...Yes, I guess I did" – Chris Farley, Soon-Tek Oh
 "The End" – George Clinton & Buckethead

Sequel
Beverly Hills Ninja 2, a sequel written by Mitch Klebanoff and co-directed by Klebanoff and Kelly Sandefur, began shooting scenes in South Korea in October 2008. The film was retitled The Dancing Ninja during filming, and was released in 2010 to negative reviews.

References

External links

 
 
 
 Parental Review of Beverly Hills Ninja

1990s martial arts comedy films
1997 action comedy films
1990s buddy comedy films
1997 martial arts films
1997 comedy films
1997 films
3 Arts Entertainment films
American action comedy films
American buddy comedy films
American martial arts comedy films
Films set in Beverly Hills, California
Films set in Japan
1990s English-language films
Films directed by Dennis Dugan
Films shot in Los Angeles County, California
Films scored by George S. Clinton
Ninja films
Ninja parody
TriStar Pictures films
Japan in non-Japanese culture
1990s American films
English-language comedy films